William Edmund Leach (7 November 1851 – 30 November 1932) was an English cricketer who played for Canterbury and Lancashire. He was born in Rochdale and died in Buckinghamshire. He appeared in six first-class matches as a righthanded batsman, scoring 235 runs with a highest score of 56 and held one catch.

Notes

1851 births
1932 deaths
Cricketers from Rochdale
English cricketers
Canterbury cricketers
Lancashire cricketers